Bulbophyllum crabro, commonly called "Kam Pu Ma" in Thai, is a small orchid that grows as an epiphyte or is sometimes found as lithophyte.  It grows in rainforests 1,600-2,000 m above sea level. It was formerly known as Monomeria barbata and was the type species of the genus Monomeria, now synonymous with Bulbophyllum. It is used in traditional Chinese medicine for treating coughs, pulmonary tuberculosis and trauma.

The plant contains phenanthrenoids.

Characteristics 
The oval pseudobulb with one leaf is 10–15 cm long and 3–3.5 cm wide.

Distribution 
Bulbophyllum crabro was originally discovered in Nepal.  This species is increasingly rare in the wild. It is found in the rain forests of Burma, Nepal, Vietnam, north-east India, China (Yunnan and Xizang provinces) and Thailand.

References

External links 

Internet Orchid Species Photo Encyclopedia

crabro
Plants described in 1830
Plants used in traditional Chinese medicine